Reijo Kalevi Mikkolainen (born May 14, 1964 in Pirkkala, Finland) is a retired professional ice hockey player who played in the SM-liiga. He won a silver medal with the Finland team at the 1988 Winter Olympics. He played for Tappara, Ilves, and TPS. He was inducted into the Finnish Hockey Hall of Fame in 2005.

Career statistics

Regular season and playoffs

International

External links
 Finnish Hockey Hall of Fame bio

1964 births
Living people
Ice hockey players at the 1988 Winter Olympics
Ilves players
Olympic ice hockey players of Finland
Olympic medalists in ice hockey
Olympic silver medalists for Finland
People from Pirkkala
Tappara players
HC TPS players
EC Peiting players
Sportspeople from Pirkanmaa